The 2018 United States Senate election in Mississippi took place on November 6, 2018, in order to elect a member of the United States Senate to represent the state of Mississippi. Incumbent Republican Roger Wicker was re-elected to a second full term, defeating his Democratic challenger, David Baria.

The candidate filing deadline was March 1, 2018, and the primary election was held on June 5, 2018, with a runoff on June 26 if a party's primary fails to produce a majority winner. The race took place on the same day as the nonpartisan jungle primary for the other U.S. Senate seat in Mississippi, which was vacated by Thad Cochran in the spring of 2018.

Republican primary

Candidates

Declared
 Roger Wicker, incumbent U.S. Senator
 Richard Boyanton, businessman

Withdrawn
 Chris McDaniel, state senator and candidate for the U.S. Senate in 2014 (running for the Class 2 U.S. Senate seat)

Endorsements

Results

Democratic primary

Candidates

Declared
 David Baria, Mississippi House of Representatives Minority Leader
 Jensen Bohren
 Jerone Garland
 Victor G. Maurice Jr.
 Omeria Scott, state representative
 Howard Sherman, businessman

Declined
 Jeramey Anderson, state representative (running for MS-4)
 Brandon Presley, chair of the Mississippi Public Service Commission

Endorsements

Polling

Results

Runoff results

Independents and third party candidates

Libertarian Party

Declared
 Danny Bedwell, candidate for MS-01 in 2012 and 2014

Reform Party

Declared
 Shawn O'Hara, perennial candidate

General election

Predictions

Fundraising

Polling

Results

References

External links
Candidates at Vote Smart
Candidates at Ballotpedia
Campaign finance at FEC
Campaign finance at OpenSecrets

Official campaign websites
David Baria (D) for Senate
Danny Bedwell (L) for Senate
Roger Wicker (R) for Senate

2018
Mississippi
United States Senate